Dorcasina matthewsii is a species of flower longhorn in the beetle family Cerambycidae. It is found in North America and was described by John Lawrence LeConte in 1869.

Dorcasina matthewsii is sometimes spelled "Dorcasina matthewsi".

References

Further reading

 
 
 
 
 
 
 
 

Lepturinae
Articles created by Qbugbot
Beetles described in 1869